Events during the year 1937 in  Northern Ireland.

Incumbents
 Governor - 	 The Duke of Abercorn 
 Prime Minister - James Craig

Events
28 February – Population census in Northern Ireland.
28 July – Assassination attempt on King George VI in Belfast by the Irish Republican Army.

Arts and literature
 Louis MacNeice writes the poem Carrickfergus.

Sport

Football
Irish League
Winners: Belfast Celtic

Irish Cup
Winners: Belfast Celtic 3 - 0 Linfield

Births
18 January – John Hume, leader of the Social Democratic and Labour Party, MP, MEP and Nobel Peace Prize winner (died 2020).
10 February – Roy Megarry, businessman and publisher in Canada.
2 April – Denis Tuohy, television presenter.
27 April – Robin Eames, Church of Ireland Primate of All Ireland and Archbishop of Armagh from 1986 to 2006.
16 December – Given Lyness, cricketer.
24 December – John Taylor, Baron Kilclooney, Ulster Unionist Party MP and life peer.

Deaths
31 January – Samuel Edgar, cricketer (born 1913).
3 February – Thomas Moles, Ulster Unionist politician and journalist (born 1871).
27 February – Charles Donnelly, poet, killed at the Jarama Front, Spanish Civil War (born 1914).
27 June – Arthur Douglas, cricketer and rugby player (born 1902).
Herbert Hughes, musicologist, composer and critic (born 1882).

See also
1937 in Scotland
1937 in Wales

References